The Union of the Corsican People (UPC) (Corsican: Unione di u Populu Corsu) was a political party in Corsica, France, founded by Max Simeoni on July 4, 1977, which represented the branch of Corsican nationalism favouring self-government. The UPC condemned all violence, notably that of the National Liberation Front of Corsica (FLNC).

In the 1982 regional elections in Corsica, the UPC won 10.61% of the votes and seven seats, but two years later it won just 5.21% and three seats. In the 1989 European election, the UPC obtained one Member of the European Parliament, Max Simeoni, running as part of the Green list headed by Antoine Waechter. The UPC was led notably by François Alfonsi, currently a Member of the European Parliament. In 2002 the UCP came to an end, merged into the new Party of the Corsican Nation (PNC).

1977 establishments in France
2002 disestablishments in France
Corsican nationalism
Defunct nationalist parties
Defunct political parties in France
Nationalist parties in France
Political parties disestablished in 2002
Political parties established in 1977
Political parties in Corsica
Political parties of the French Fifth Republic